The Paeroa-Pokeno railway line or deviation in the upper North Island of New Zealand between Paeroa on the East Coast Main Trunk (ECMT) and Pokeno on the North Island Main Trunk (NIMT) was a proposed route with construction started but abandoned. The proposal has been revived in recent years as part of a more direct route between Auckland and Tauranga.

History 

A request for the line was made in 1905 and a route surveyed in 1926. Proposals were also made to shorten the route by a further , by starting it at Manurewa and serving Hunua. Most of the work was still in place in the 1960s, though very little is now visible.

The Kaimai Tunnel relegated this section to ghost status; in August 1962 a deviation from Wahora to Apata passing under the Kaimai Range in a long  tunnel was approved. Work on the tunnel did not commence until 1969. With the opening of the tunnel in 1978, the Paeroa – Katikati section of the East Coast Main Trunk was closed. The line to Paeroa was then part of the Thames Branch, which closed north of Waitoa in 1991.

Originally the line was to be the first part of the East Coast Main Trunk Railway crossing the Bay of Plenty to Opotiki and then inland to Gisborne via the Moutohora Branch.

Revival 
During the 2014 New Zealand general election the New Zealand First political party included a proposal to build a Pokeno-Paeroa-Te Aroha-Kaimai tunnel railway line as part of its "Railways of National Significance" transport policy. The policy consists of completing the Pokeno-Paeroa line, re-using part of the now-closed Thames Branch between Paeroa and Te Aroha and a new link between Te Aroha and the western portal of the Kaimai tunnel, altogether creating a more direct link along a faster route, providing more capacity on the very busy rail freight corridor between Auckland and Tauranga, together with linking the towns of Maramarua, Ngatea, Paeroa and Te Aroha as potential future satellite suburbs of Auckland on a new commuter rail service route between Auckland and Tauranga.

See also 
Paeroa Railway Station 
Pokeno Railway Station
Taneatua Express

References

Citations

Bibliography

External links
 

1938 photo of river dredge and gravel pipeline to the railway
1942 one inch map showing where the railway was under construction

Proposed railway lines in New Zealand
Rail transport in the Bay of Plenty Region
Waikato District
Rail transport in Waikato